The Iranian National Time Trial Championships is a cycling race where the Iranian cyclists decide who will become the champion for the year to come.

Men

Elite

U23

See also
Iranian National Road Race Championships
National Road Cycling Championships

National road cycling championships
Cycle races in Iran